Blossoms Shanghai is an upcoming Chinese TV series directed and produced by Wong Kar-wai. It is adapted from the novel Blossoms written by Jin Yucheng. The series is set in Shanghai in the 1990s and stars Hu Ge, Ma Yili, Tiffany Tang, and Xin Zhilei as lead. It is the first TV series directed by Wong Kar-wai. The series is scheduled to complete shooting in 2023.

Cast and characters
Hu Ge as A Bao
Ma Yili
Tiffany Tang
Xin Zhilei
You Benchang
Zheng Kai
Jonny Chen
Dong Yong
Huang Jue
Yang Haoyu
Chloe Maayan

Production

Pre-production
In March 2019, Wong Kar-wai revealed his plan on adapting the novel Blossoms at the Spring tea party of Hong Kong Screenwriters' Guild. This work would be the third of his trilogy, following In the Mood for Love and 2046. At the tea party, he also said this work had been prepared for 4 years and its script would be completed soon. In addition, he indicated that the cast crew must speak Shanghainese. In October 2019, Han Zhijie, the vice president of Tencent Video, announced that the preparations for Blossoms Shanghai have been completed and filming will start in next spring.

In March 2020, Wong Kar-Wai arrived in Shanghai to prepare for both TV series and film versions of Blossoms Shanghai. On August 2, 2020, the series was officially announced at the 2020 Tencent Video annual conference, starring Hu Ge. On August 5, 2020, in order to 
recreate the period setting, the series published a notice in the Shanghai newspaper Xinmin Evening News asking for old items from citizens related to 1990s' Shanghai. As demonstrations, Hu Ge, Jin Yucheng, and Wong Kar-Wai shared their old sewing machine, wedding dress, and Shaoxing wine respectively.

Casting
On August 2, 2020, the series announced the male lead Hu Ge at the 2020 Tencent Video annual conference. On November 3, 2022, the series revealed three female leads, Ma Yili, Tiffany Tang, and Xin Zhilei at the Zhejiang TV Fall investment conference. On November 3, 2022, the series announced more cast crews, including You Benchang, Zheng Kai, Jonny Chen, Dong Yong, Huang Jue, Yang Haoyu, and Chloe Maayan.

Filming
The filming officially began in Shanghai on September 10, 2020. The main scene "Huanghe Road" was rebuilt in 1:1 scale at Shanghai Film Park in Songjiang District, Shanghai.

In October 2022, the visual director Peter Pau revealed that Wong were creating each episode of TV series in film style with 50 minutes per episode, which made the filming took over 3 years. In January 2023, Wang Jianer, the secretary of the party committee and president of Shanghai Film Group, said the series will complete filming and broadcast in 2023.

Marketing 
On June 7, 2021, the series released its first trailer - Time is like water, showing the flashing memories of Hu Ge's character A Bao. On November 3, 2022, the series released the second trailer - Blossoms are like brocade, that includes the debuts of three female leads and a sumptuous scene of Huanghe Road in old Shanghai.

References

External links 
 
 

Upcoming television series
Television shows based on Chinese novels
Television shows set in Shanghai
Television series set in the 1990s
Shanghainese-language television shows